Crisafulli is a surname. Notable people with the surname include:

 David Crisafulli (born 1979), Australian politician
 Fabrizio Crisafulli, theatre director and visual artist
 Henri Crisafulli (1827–1900), French playwright 
 Steve Crisafulli (born 1971), American politician

Italian-language surnames